Smiths Settlement is a small rural community located in the Halifax Regional Municipality in Nova Scotia, Canada. It is located along Route 207, which is a winding two-lane road that runs through the community. The area is known for its scenic beauty, with forests, fields, and streams in the surrounding countryside. There are a few small businesses in the community, including a gas station, a general store, and a post office. The community is home to a small number of residents, many of whom are involved in agriculture or forestry. There are several churches and a community hall in the area, and the community is known for its close-knit and friendly atmosphere.

Navigator

References
Explore HRM
Smiths Settlement

Communities in Halifax, Nova Scotia
General Service Areas in Nova Scotia